Kuījī (632–682), also known as Ji, an exponent of Yogācāra, was a Chinese monk and a prominent disciple of Xuanzang. His posthumous name was Cí'ēn dàshī, The Great Teacher of Cien Monastery, after the Daci'en Temple or Great Monastery of Compassionate Grace, which was located in Chang'an, the main capital of the Tang Dynasty. The Giant Wild Goose Pagoda was built in Daci'en Temple in 652. According to biographies, he was sent to the imperial translation bureau headed by Xuanzang, from whom he later would learn Sanskrit, Abhidharma, and Yogācāra.

Kuiji collaborated closely with Xuanzang on the Cheng weishi lun, a redacted translation of commentaries on Vasubandhu's Triṃśikā-vijñaptimātratā. Kuiji's commentaries on the former text, the Cheng weishi lun shuji, along with his original treatise on Yogācāra, the Dasheng Fayuan yilin chang ("Essays on the Forest of Meanings in the Mahāyāna Dharma Garden") became foundations of the Faxiang School, the dominant school of Yogācāra thought in East Asia. He is accordingly considered the founder of this school which differed notably from Paramārtha's earlier Chinese Yogācāra system. Kuiji is also known for his commentaries on Dharmapāla's Yogācāra philosophy.

Works

Mahayana Sutra Commentaries
Amitābha and Maitreya Sūtras 
Diamond Sūtra
Heart Sūtra. Translated by Shih and Lusthaus (2006).
Lotus Sūtra (Fahua xuanzan, "Profound Panegyric to the Lotus Sūtra") 
Vimalakīrtinirdeśa-sūtra

Pramana
Great Commentary on the Nyayapravesa

Commentaries on Yogacara treatises
Cheng weishi lun shuji (成唯識 論述記; Taishō no. 1830, vol. 43, 229a-606c), a commentary on Xuanzang's Cheng weishi lun
Madhyāntavibhāga
Sthiramati's Commentary on Asaṅga's Abhidharmasamuccaya 
Vasubandhu's Twenty Verses (Viṃśatikā))
Vasubandhu's One Hundred Dharmas Treatise 
Yogācārabhūmi

Notes

References
 Shih, Heng-Ching & Lusthaus, Dan. (2006) A Comprehensive Commentary on the Heart Sutra (Prajnaparamita-hyrdaya-sutra). Numata Center for Buddhist Translation & Research.
Lusthaus, Dan (undated). Quick Overview of the Faxiang School. Source:  (accessed: December 12, 2007)
 Katsura, Shoryu (2014). The Theory of Apoha in Kuiji’s "Cheng weishi lun Shuji" (Katsura, Shoryu). In Lin, Chen-kuo , Radich, Michael (eds), A Distant Mirror - Articulating Indic Ideas in Sixth and Seventh Century Chinese Buddhism, Hamburg Buddhist Studies vol. 3, Hamburg  University Press. pp. 101-120

632 births
682 deaths
Tang dynasty Buddhist monks
Founders of Buddhist sects
Yogacara